Erin is a color that is halfway between green and spring green on the color wheel. It is named after Erin, a poetic name for Ireland.

One of the earliest known uses of the word "erin" to describe a color appears in the poetry of Jane Johnston Schoolcraft (1800–1842). In a poem titled To the Pine Trees, Schoolcraft reflects on her arrival back to North America after spending years in England she writes "Not all the trees of England bright, / Not Erin's lawns of green and light / are half so sweet to memory's eye, / As this dear type of northern sky."

See also 
 Erin (disambiguation)
 List of colors

References

Quaternary colors